Kentucky Route 39 (KY 39) is a state highway in the U.S. state of Kentucky. The route, part of the State Secondary System, exists in two segments, separated at the Madison-Jessamine county line by the Kentucky River. While there is a boat ramp on each side, there is no bridge or ferry carrying vehicular traffic across the waterway. The southernmost terminus of the route is at Kentucky Route 1247 in Somerset. The northernmost terminus is at U.S. Route 27 Business and Kentucky Route 29 in Nicholasville.

Although KY 39 ends, the roadway continues north to the south bank of the river at the confluence of Paint Lick Creek; there is a concrete boat landing at the site of an old ferry crossing. The segment between Lancaster and the river is locally called Buckeye Pike. The southern terminus of the northern segment is at the boat launch on the north bank.

Major intersections

History
From 1958 to 1981 the southern terminus was located at US 27, via University Drive, this changed back to Kentucky 1247.

References

0039
Kentucky Route 0039